Rajko Janjanin (born 18 January 1957) is a Yugoslav of Croatian Serb descent former international football player, who played as a midfielder.

Club career
Janjanin started his professional career in 1975 playing for Dinamo Zagreb , with whom he played for five years, winning the Yugoslav Cup in 1980.
He then joined Red Star Belgrade for almost five years. His shining moment took place on 19 September 1984 when he scored a second half hat-trick for Red Star in the 3–2 win over Benfica for the European Cup after Red star was down by 0–2. With Red Star he won two Yugoslav Championship and a Yugoslav cup in 1982, while he became an international footballer.

In November 1984, he moved to Greece and transferred to OFI where he performed very well and had a decisive contribution to the Cretan team winning second place in the Greek Championship in 1986. While his contract was coming to an end, he was offered a renewal by the management of OFI, but there was a rift since he was asking for 18 million drachmas for a two-year contract and he was offered much less money. AEK Athens, which were interested, included him in their team in December 1986, fully meeting the demands of the footballer and despite the opposition from OFI. He played in AEK until the summer of 1988, with which he did not score a high performance, but sometimes showed samples of his footballing quality and ended his career there in 1988.

International career
Janjanin was capped twice for Yugoslavia.

Personal life
His brother Željko was also a footballer.

Honours

Dinamo Zagreb
Yugoslav Cup: 1980

Red Star
Yugoslav Championship: 1981, 1984
Yugoslav Cup: 1982, 1985

References

External links
Profile on Serbian federation official site

1957 births
Living people
Sportspeople from Karlovac
NK Karlovac players
GNK Dinamo Zagreb players
Serbs of Croatia
Serbian footballers
Yugoslav footballers
Yugoslavia international footballers
Association football midfielders
AEK Athens F.C. players
OFI Crete F.C. players
Red Star Belgrade footballers
Yugoslav First League players
Super League Greece players
Serbian expatriate footballers
Expatriate footballers in Greece
Mediterranean Games gold medalists for Yugoslavia
Competitors at the 1979 Mediterranean Games
Mediterranean Games medalists in football